The Dartmoor Way is a long-distance footpath and cycle route centred on the Dartmoor National Park in southern Devon, England. The loop route of approximately  that encompasses upland and moorland walking, deep Devon lanes, and also passes through towns and villages such as Okehampton, Chagford, Moretonhampstead, Buckfastleigh, Princetown and Tavistock.

The Dartmoor Way links with the Tarka Trail, West Devon Way and Two Castles Trail.

References 

Dartmoor
Long-distance footpaths in England
Footpaths in Devon